Patrick Tugume Tusingwire (b 1952) was an Anglican bishop in Uganda: he was Bishop of Kigezi from 2011 to 2011.

References

Anglican bishops of North Kigezi
21st-century Anglican bishops in Uganda
1952 births
Living people